Stuart Parish is a Rural locality of Bogan Shire at 30°51′22″S 146°46′17″E and civil Parish of Cowper County, New South Wales.

Stuart parish has a Köppen climate classification of BSh (Hot semi arid).

References

Parishes of Cowper County
Localities in New South Wales